(Robert) Julian Onderdonk (July 30, 1882 – October 27, 1922) was a Texan Impressionist painter, often called "the father of Texas painting."

Early years 
Julian Onderdonk was born in San Antonio, Texas, to Robert Jenkins Onderdonk, a painter, and Emily Gould Onderdonk. He was the brother of Eleanor Onderdonk, also a prominent Texas painter, sculptor, and art administrator. His grandfather Henry Onderdonk was the Headmaster of Saint James School in Maryland, from which Julian's father Robert graduated.

He was raised in South Texas and was an enthusiastic sketcher and painter. As a teenager Onderdonk was influenced and received some training from the prominent Texas artist Verner Moore White who also lived in San Antonio at the time.  He attended the West Texas Military Academy, now the TMI Episcopal, graduating in 1900.

Career
At 19, with the help of a generous neighbor, Julian left Texas in order to study with the renowned American Impressionist William Merritt Chase. Julian's father, Robert, had also once studied with Chase. Julian spent the summer of 1901 on Long Island at Chase's Shinnecock Hills Summer School of Art. He studied with Chase for a couple of years and then moved to New York City to attempt to make a living as an en plein air artist. While in New York he met and married Gertrude Shipman and they soon had a daughter, Adrienne.

Onderdonk returned to San Antonio in 1909, where he produced his best work. His most popular subjects were bluebonnet landscapes.

President George W. Bush decorated the Oval Office with three of Onderdonk's paintings. The Dallas Museum of Art has several rooms dedicated exclusively to Onderdonk's work.

His art studio currently resides on the grounds of the Witte Museum.

Harry A. Halff and Elizabeth Halff spent twenty years gathering his works into a book they published called Julian Onderdonk: A Catalogue Raisonne. The San Antonio Museum of Art created an exhibit to coincide with the publication of the book which included 25 of Onderdonk's paintings from January 20-April 23, 2017.

Death 
Onderdonk died of an acute intestinal obstruction and appendicitis on October 27, 1922, in San Antonio.  He was buried in Alamo Masonic Cemetery.

Paintings

References

External links 

 Texas Bluebonnet Painters Web Site
AskArt auction results for Julian Onderdonk
The works of Julian Onderdonk from the perspective of a Texas dealer-Fine Arts of Texas, Inc.

1882 births
1922 deaths
19th-century American painters
19th-century American male artists
TMI Episcopal alumni
American male painters
20th-century American painters
American Impressionist painters
People from San Antonio
American people of Dutch descent
Artists from Texas
20th-century American male artists